Loxophlebia vesparis is a moth of the subfamily Arctiinae. It was described by Arthur Gardiner Butler in 1873. It is found in Peru and Bolivia.

References

 Arctiidae genus list at Butterflies and Moths of the World of the Natural History Museum

Loxophlebia
Moths described in 1873